Otar Korghalidze (born 2 September 1960) is a Georgian former professional football player and manager.

During his playing career Korgalidze played for various clubs in Georgia, Austria, Azerbaijan and Estonia. He spent several seasons in the Soviet Top League and Soviet First League with FC Guria Lanchkhuti, FC Dinamo Tbilisi and FC Torpedo Kutaisi. Korgalidze scored 3 goals in 8 games during his short spell at Flora Tallinn. Otar Korgalidze retired in 2000. His last club was FC Kuressaare.

He is also a former member of the Georgia national football team.

Following his playing career, Korgalidze was a manager for FC Sioni Bolnisi.

His son Levan Korgalidze played for the Georgia national football team.

References

External links
 
 

1960 births
Living people
Footballers from Georgia (country)
Georgia (country) international footballers
Erovnuli Liga players
FC Guria Lanchkhuti players
FC Dinamo Tbilisi players
FC Flora players
FC Alazani Gurjaani players
Expatriate sportspeople from Georgia (country) in Estonia
FC Kuressaare players
Expatriate footballers in Estonia
Football managers from Georgia (country)
FC Dinamo Tbilisi managers
Footballers from Tbilisi
Association football forwards
Meistriliiga players
Expatriate sportspeople from Georgia (country) in Azerbaijan
Expatriate footballers in Azerbaijan
Expatriate sportspeople from Georgia (country) in Austria
Expatriate footballers in Austria